Mesestola guadeloupensis is a species of beetle in the family Cerambycidae. It was described by Stephan von Breuning in 1980. It is known from Guadeloupe.

References

Calliini
Beetles described in 1980